The Volvo LV101-112, or the Sharpnose was a light truck produced by Swedish automaker Volvo between 1938 and 1950.

History
In 1938 Volvo presented its light LV101-series truck, affectionately known as the "Sharpnose". At the same time Volvo introduced the taxicab PV800. The two models series shared engine, radiator cover and bonnet. The smallest model LV101 was mechanically almost identical to the taxicab, while the larger LV102 was a “genuine” truck.

In 1940 the program was supplemented with the heavier LV110/111/112, built on three different wheelbases.

After the Second World War Volvo updated the truck series with the stronger ED engine, renaming it L201/202.

Engines

Gallery

References

External links 

 Volvo Trucks Global - history
 Swedish brass cars - picture gallery

Sharpnose
Vehicles introduced in 1938